George W. Weeden was an American politician who served in the Wisconsin State Assembly and for whom Weedens, Wisconsin, was named.

Biography
Weeden was born on September 7, 1822, in Hampton, New York. He later settled in Wilson, Sheboygan County, Wisconsin.

Career
Weeden was a member of the Assembly during the 1872 and 1883 sessions. Other positions he held include chairman of the Sheboygan County Board of Supervisors, county judge and county treasurer of Sheboygan County, Wisconsin.

Weedens was also an unsuccessful candidate for county treasurer in 1870. He was a Democrat.

References

People from Hampton, New York
People from Sheboygan County, Wisconsin
Wisconsin state court judges
County supervisors in Wisconsin
County treasurers in Wisconsin
County judges in the United States
1822 births
Year of death missing
Democratic Party members of the Wisconsin State Assembly